This is the list of Japanese municipalities by population, as of December 31, 1889. The list includes all the cities, as well as other municipalities with more population than Kurume, the least populous city at the time.

Source: Japanese Wikipedia article of 市制 (City system), retrieved on July 4, 2008.

Japanese national population is as of December 31, 1888.
Municipal statuses, names, and populations are as of December 31, 1889.
Prefectural capital statuses are as of 2008.

These municipalities changed their names:
Akamaseki, now a part of Shimonoseki.
Ujiyamada, now a part of Ise.
Shuri, now a part of Naha.
Nanba, now a part of Chūō Ward, Osaka.
Naha, Takamatsu, and Shuri were unofficial place names given to the groups of smaller towns or villages.

References

Population
Japan